Isaac Smith was an Anglican priest in Ireland during the 17th century.

Smith was educated at Trinity College, Dublin. He was Archdeacon of Killala  from 1673 until 1685.

Notes

Alumni of Trinity College Dublin
17th-century Irish Anglican priests
Archdeacons of Killala